An express train is a type of passenger train that makes a small number of stops between its origin and destination stations, usually major destinations, allowing faster service than local trains that stop at most or all of the stations along their route. They are sometimes referred to as "fast trains" (or an equivalent term, such as the German Schnellzug), meaning that they are faster than other trains on the same route. Though many high-speed rail services are express, not all express trains are "fast" relative to other services; early trains in the 19th-century United Kingdom were categorized as express trains as long as they had a "journey speed" of at least . Express trains sometimes have higher fares than other routes, and bearers of a rail pass may be required to pay an extra fee. First class may be the only one available.
Some express train routes that overlap with local train service may stop at stations near the tail ends of the line. This can be done, for example, where there is no supplemental local service to those stations. Express train routes may also become local when ridership is not high enough to justify parallel local service, such as during the night.

See also

 Limited express
 Limited-stop
 Regional rail
 Inter-city rail
 Highball Signal

References

External links
 Brief history of express/local combination service on Chicago's North Side Main Line
 A history on London Underground's Metropolitan line, including its "fast" or express service

Passenger rail transport
Trains